Henry's House is a platform game developed by Chris Murray for Atari 8-bit family and Commodore 64. The Commodore 64 version was published by English Software in 1984, while the Atari 8-bit version from by Mastertronic followed in 1987. The game, produced in the United Kingdom, is loosely based on Prince Henry of Wales who was then a baby. The working title of the game was Home Sweet Home.

Gameplay

In Henry's House, the player guides Henry through the numerous rooms of the house. Each room in is filled with deadly household items like: toothbrushes, toasters, kettles and coffee makers. Touching one of these objects kills Henry. Falling from too great a height has a similar effect.

The goal is to reach the exit of each room. To do so, Henry must find the key, which appears only after some particular action is taken, and gather all the items that are scattered around the room.

Reception
Henry's House received positive reviews. Bob Powers reviewed the game for the Atari User magazine and gave it an overall rating of 9, highlighting the great graphics and excellent value for money. Bob Chappell also praised the game in his review for the Personal Computer News. He concluded: "The graphics and animation are absolutely superb. There's a wide variety of excellent sound effects and the different challenges make this a game not to be missed."

References

External links
Henry's House at Atari Mania
 

1984 video games
Atari 8-bit family games
Commodore 64 games
Mastertronic games
Platform games
Video games developed in the United Kingdom
English Software games